Collin Wilcox may refer to:
Collin Wilcox (writer) (1924–1996), American mystery writer
Collin Wilcox (actress) (1935–2009), American actress